Wapiti, or elk, are a species of large deer.

Wapiti may also refer to:

Animals 
 Boulder darter (Etheostoma wapiti), a species of fish

Places 
 Wapiti Pass, a mountain pass in British Columbia, Canada
 Wapiti River, a river in British Columbia and Alberta, Canada
 Wapiti Lake Provincial Park, a provincial park in British Columbia, Canada
 Wapiti Ranger Station, a ranger station in Shoshone National Forest, Wyoming, United States
 Grande Prairie-Wapiti, a provincial electoral district in Alberta, Canada
 Wapiti, Wyoming, a town in Wyoming, United States

Other uses 
 Westland Wapiti, a British military aeroplane built in the 1920s